Luís Filipe da Silva Barry (born 30 January 1982) is a Portuguese professional footballer who plays for Lusitano FCV as a striker.

Club career
Born in Corroios, Seixal, Setúbal District, Barry played lower league or amateur football until the age of 30, representing mainly Atlético S.C. and scoring a career-best 18 fourth division goals for them in the 2008–09 season. In January 2012 he moved to the professionals when he signed for Segunda Liga club Atlético Clube de Portugal, making his debut in the competition later that month in a 5–0 away loss against G.D. Estoril Praia.

After one year with U.D. Oliveirense also in the second tier, Barry joined G.D. Chaves. During his spell at the Estádio Municipal Eng. Manuel Branco Teixeira he scored regularly, notably contributing 12 goals in 43 games in the 2015–16 campaign as the side returned to the Primeira Liga after a lengthy absence; he was notified of his release through an SMS.

References

External links

1982 births
Living people
People from Seixal
Sportspeople from Setúbal District
Portuguese footballers
Association football forwards
Liga Portugal 2 players
Segunda Divisão players
Atlético S.C. players
Lusitano G.C. players
Atlético Clube de Portugal players
U.D. Oliveirense players
G.D. Chaves players
C.D. Aves players
Académico de Viseu F.C. players
Lusitano FCV players